Acıbadem is a neighbourhood of Üsküdar district, Istanbul. Acıbadem is bordered on the east by Ünalan, on the west by Altunizade, on the north by Küçükçamlıca, and on the south by Hasanpaşa (a neighbourhood of Kadıköy district).

References

Neighbourhoods of Üsküdar